The Alfa Romeo Giulia TZ (also known as the Alfa Romeo TZ or Tubolare Zagato) was a sports car and racing car manufactured by Alfa Romeo from 1963 to 1967. It replaced the Giulietta SZ. In 2011, the name was reduced from Giulia TZ to TZ in the new TZ3 model.

Giulia TZ

The original TZ, currently sometimes referenced as TZ1 to differ from later TZ2 was presented at the 1962 Turin Auto Show.

It featured a 1,570 cc twin cam engine and other mechanical components shared with the Alfa Romeo Giulia and carried a 105 series chassis number, but was a purpose built sports racing car, with a tubular spaceframe chassis built in the province of Perugia by SAI Ambrosini and the light all-aluminium bodywork was made by Zagato, final assembly was made Delta of Udine, with Carlo Chiti initially on board as a consultant before becoming the project leader. The firm soon changed its name to Auto-Delta and relocated to its current site in Settimo Milanese, on the outskirts of Milan, not far from the Alfa Romeo Portello Plant.

It has disc brakes and independent suspension. Alfa's twin-spark cylinder head, as also used in their GTA, contributed to the speed of the TZ; the standard Giulia alloy block with wet steel liners was installed at an angle under the hood of the TZ to improve airflow.

Aiding the TZ in its quest for performance was the treatment of the rear bodywork.  Incorporating the research of Dr. Wunibald Kamm, the TZ used a style called  in Italian, meaning "short tail.", otherwise known as the Kamm tail. The principle is that unless an aircraft-like extended tail is incorporated, which is not practical for an automobile, there is little, if any, increase in drag and a marked decrease in lift or even some downforce by simply chopping off a portion of the tail. Zagato had previously proved the success of this tail treatment in their  Sprint Zagato sports-racing cars, and it was a natural evolution to adapt this to the Giulia TZ.

The car debuted at the 1963 FISA Monza Cup, where TZs took the first four places in the prototype category. At the beginning of 1964 the TZ was homologated (100 units were needed for homologation) to the Gran Turismo category. After homologation it started to take more class wins in Europe and North-America. Of the first TZ, 112 units were built between 1963 and 1965.
Only built as limited amount these TZ models are quite collectibles nowadays, listed price around 150,000-200,000 US dollars.

Engine
1,570 cc straight-4 DOHC 112 bhp (82 kW) at 6500 rpm (road trim), 160 bhp (118 kW) (race trim)

Giulia TZ2

A new version of TZ was introduced at the Turin Auto Show in 1964 in the Zagato stand. The new design was called the Alfa Romeo Giulia TZ2. With this engine the car reached top speed of
. The rear window was also changed, now single unit rather than three part window in TZ. Development of TZ cars was stopped in the end of 1965, to make room for the new Alfa Romeo GTA racing program. Only 12 TZ2s were built.

The car won the prestigious Gran Turismo Trophy at the 2009 Pebble Beach Concours d'Elegance.

Race results
The TZ2 took class win on 25 April 1965 in the 1000 km of Monza, with Bussinello-De Adamich finishing seventh overall and first in the GT 1600 category. Also in 1965 it took class victories thanks to Rolland-Consten in the 12 Hours of Sebring; Bianchi-Rolland in the Targa Florio; and Adamich-"Geki" in the 1000 km of Nürburgring, the 6 Hours of Melbourne, the Giro d'Italia and the Criterium des Cevennes. There were further class wins the following year: at Monza (De Adamich-Zeccoli), Sebring (Andrey-"Geki"), in the Targa Florio (Pinto-Todaro) and at the Nürburgring (Bianchi-Schultze).

TZ3

A homage to the TZ3 was made in two different iterations in 2010, celebrating Alfa Romeo's centenary.

Zagato TZ3 Corsa

The Alfa Romeo TZ3 Corsa is the track version of the TZ3 (hence the name TZ3 Corsa, Corsa meaning race in Italian) built to celebrate 100 years (a century) of Alfa Romeo in racing. The Corsa is a one-off car that was first presented at, and won, the 2010 Concorso d'Eleganza Villa d'Este in Italy. It is based on the Gillet Vertigo.5 and was made for German collector Martin Kapp.

The car weighs  thanks to its carbon fibre frame and hand beaten aluminium body panels and has a  dry sump 4.2 litre V8 engine.

The chassis is a carbon-fiber monocoque with some tubular elements. The suspension setup, front and rear, are double wishbones, with pushrod actuated coil springs, and dampers from Ohlins.

Zagato TZ3 Stradale
The Alfa Romeo TZ3 Stradale is the road version of the TZ3 (hence the name TZ3 Stradale, stradale meaning road in Italian), designed by Norihiko Harada of Zagato, and was built to celebrate 100 years of Alfa Romeo on the road. The TZ3's chassis is based on the Dodge Viper ACR-X, and has been re-bodied to suit road conditions. Only nine units of the vehicle have been made.

Redline is reached at 6,250 rpm. All of this power is delivered to the rear wheels, via a 6-speed Tremec TR6060 manual transmission.

The interior design is mainly the same as a regular Viper, but has Alfa Romeo badging.

The body and the frame come from the ACR-X, which are manufactured with SMC & rim panels over a tubular space frame.

The brake discs, which are 2-piece, come from StopTech, and the calipers are from Brembo.

The steering wheel is rack-and-pinion, with power assist.

The suspension setup for front and rear are A-arms, with coil-over shocks and stabilizer bars.

See also 
 Alfa Romeo in motorsport
 World Sportscar Championship

Notes

References

 Alfa Romeo Guides on QV500.com

Giulia TZ
Sports racing cars
Cars introduced in 1963
Rear-wheel-drive vehicles
Coupés